Katts and Dog is a French and Canadian-produced television series that ran from 1988 to 1993. It was known as Rin Tin Tin: K-9 Cop in the United States where it originally aired on CBN Cable/The Family Channel and Rintintin Junior in France on La Cinq. CTV broadcast the series within Canada.

When the episodes were filmed (and shown in Canada) the dog’s name was "Rudy". When the series was aired in the US and France, the name was dubbed as "Rinty" to go with the new title. However, some episodes of Katts and Dog have the American dubbing where "Rudy" is called "Rinty" throughout the episode. The episode "Hit and Run" is an example of this. Herbert B. Leonard, who owned the rights to the Rin Tin Tin trademark, was an executive producer on the show; he was not directly active in production and left before the series concluded in a dispute with Pat Robertson, who as owner of CBN had provided much of the show's funding.

When the series went out in Britain, it kept the title Katts and Dog, but the dog's name was changed to "Rinty".

Synopsis

A man and a remarkable Alsatian/German Shepherd dog make surprising crime stoppers in this dramatic action/adventure series.

The show is about the life of a special breed of cop - Canine Officer Hank Katts; a strong, self-made survivor from immigrant stock who's fought his way up from a tough steel mill town - and his canine partner who fight crime and the forces of evil.  Katts's courage and street smarts  make him a good police officer, but his rebellious, questioning side makes him a difficult partner to work with.  That is why he's assigned to the K-9 Corps, the police dog unit.
  
The show’s early episodes begin with Hank just finishing up Police Academy. Later on, it shows the first meeting between Katts and Rudy/Rinty when he rescues the apparently vicious animal from an abusive owner.  When the dog's breed papers reveal it to be a great-great-grandson of the legendary film star dog Rin-Tin-Tin, it is assigned to the force with Hank as its handler and given a name reflecting its famous ancestor ... Rinnie.

With the latest in hi-tech crime-fighting equipment, the pair create a powerful team.  Rinnie's keen instincts, loyalty and courage help Hank catch burglars, raid drug dens, defuse time bombs, find lost children and protect the weak from muggers.
  
It also shows the life of Hank’s nephew, Steve, through the death of his mother and his adoption by Officer Katts.

A 1991 TV movie had Officer Katts and Rudy visit Paris (titled Rin Tin Tin and the Paris Conspiracy in the US).

Cast
 Jesse Collins as Officer Hank Katts
 Andrew Bednarski as Steve Katts
 Rudolph Von Holstein III as Rudy/Rinty
 Denise Virieux as Officer Renee Daumier
 Nancy Anne Sakovich as Officer Leah McCray
 Peter MacNeill as Sergeant Callahan
 Dan Martin as Officer Lou Adams
 Phil Jarrett as Sergeant O.C. Phillips
 Denis Akiyama as Officer Ron Nakamura
 Brian Kaulback as Officer Dennis Brian
 Cali Timmins as Maggie Davenport
 Corrine Koslo as Officer Connie Booth
 Ken Pogue as Captain Cullen Murdoch
 Michael Quinsey as Max Kane/Dog Trainer
 Chuck Shamata as Lieutenant Logan

Episodes

Season 1 (1988–89)

Season 2 (1989–90)

Season 3 (1990–91)

Season 4 (1991)

Season 5 (1992–93)

References

External links

 
 Canadian TV exports list
 Katts and Dog - Ein Herz und eine Schnauze, a German site with an episode list and notes for all five seasons
 konarciq.net -Katts and Dog / Rin Tin Tin K-9 Cop episode guide

1980s Canadian crime drama television series
1990s Canadian crime drama television series
1988 Canadian television series debuts
1993 Canadian television series endings
CTV Television Network original programming
The Family Channel (American TV network, founded 1990) original programming
Television shows filmed in Toronto
English-language television shows
Rin Tin Tin